Ben Morgan Lake (born 22 January 1993) is a Plaid Cymru politician serving as the Member of Parliament (MP) for Ceredigion since 2017.

Background

Lake was born and brought up in Lampeter, the son of a police officer and a council worker. He attended Ffynnonbedr Primary School and Ysgol Bro Pedr. After graduating from Trinity College, Oxford, with an undergraduate degree in History and Politics, and a master's degree in Modern British and European History, he became a Research Officer in the National Assembly for Wales. His first language is Welsh, which was seen as a key factor in his election as MP for one of the strongest Welsh-speaking constituencies in Wales.

Political career

In the 2017 general election, Lake won the Ceredigion constituency, gaining the seat from Liberal Democrat Mark Williams with 11,623 votes (29.2% of the overall vote). In the 2019 general election, Lake retained his seat with 15,208 votes (37.9% of the overall vote). He is currently the youngest MP in Wales, and the youngest ever elected for Plaid Cymru.

Lake is currently the Plaid Cymru spokesperson at Westminster for the Environment, Food, Rural Affairs, Education, Skills, Health, Communities, Local Government, Culture, Media, Sport and Constitutional Affairs. Lake was appointed a member of the Welsh Affairs Committee in September 2017. He is a member of the All-Party Parliamentary Group on State Pension Inequality for Women. He supported Rhun ap Iorwerth in the 2018 Plaid Cymru leadership election.

In December 2017, Lake was awarded the 'Politician to Watch' prize as part of the ITV Welsh Politician of the Year Awards 2017. In August 2019, Lake was nominated for the MP of the Year Award, acknowledging MPs who actively work with under-represented and disadvantaged communities across the UK.

Lake is Chair of the All-Party Parliamentary Group on Western Sahara. and a Vice-Chair of the All-Party Parliamentary Group for Choice at the End of Life.

References

External links

All-Party Parliamentary Group for Choice at the End of Life

1993 births
Living people
Plaid Cymru MPs
UK MPs 2017–2019
UK MPs 2019–present
Welsh-speaking politicians
People educated at Lampeter School
Alumni of Trinity College, Oxford
People from Carmarthen